, literally Isaki of the Cub, is a Japanese manga series written and illustrated by Hitoshi Ashinano. It first appeared in the August 2007 issue as a one-shot and subsequently became a semi-regular feature in Kodansha'a Monthly Afternoon manga magazine. The series ended in the January 2013 issue, and the final volume was released in January 2013 as well.

Kabu no Isaki shares many characteristic hallmarks of Ashinano's style: fascination with aeronautical themes; a setting in the future; a setting on and around the Miura peninsula; a vision of Japan that is isolated and nostalgic; and a natural world full of mystery that the protagonists explore with a sense of wonder. As such there are many parallels with Ashinano's previous work Yokohama Kaidashi Kikō.

Plot
 is a young airplane pilot who flies a Piper Super Cub. The Cub is owned by his neighbour , and Isaki often flies errands for her as a way to pay for his use of the plane. Shiro's younger sister  is also capable of flying the plane and occasionally accompanies Isaki on his journeys.

The story is notable for distortions in the scale of the world, which is ten times bigger than normal. This number is both explicitly mentioned, and is also depicted by geographical features that exist in reality being ten times larger in the story. Certain other features of the world are also gigantic, such as the Tokyo Tower which is described as 3333 meters tall (ten times larger than in real life). The plants are also gigantic, up to roughly 100 times larger than normal, although most are normal-sized. As is typical with Ashinano's stories, no explanations are given for the distortions, so the reader is left to wonder along with the characters.

Manga

Volume list

References

External links

Kodansha manga
Seinen manga